| top point scorer = Alexandre Péclier (Bourgoin)(113 points)
| top try scorer = Laurent Leflamand (Bourgoin)(7 tries)
| venue = Stade de la Méditerranée, Béziers
| attendance2 = 10,000
| champions =  Bourgoin
| count = 1
| runner-up =  Castres Olympique
| website = https://web.archive.org/web/20080506141030/http://www.ercrugby.com/eng/
| previous year = 
| previous tournament = 
| next year = 1997–98
| next tournament = 1997–98 European Challenge Cup
}}

The 1996–97 European Challenge Cup (also called the 1996–97 European Shield) was the inaugural year of the European Challenge Cup, the second tier rugby union cup competition below the Heineken Cup. The tournament was held between October 1996 and January 1997 and was won by Bourgoin with an 18–9 victory over Castres in the final at the Stade de la Méditerranée in Béziers, France. Twenty-four teams took part from England, France, Ireland, Italy, Romania, Scotland and Wales, divided into four groups of six. Each team played the other teams in the group once, meaning each had five matches with either two or three on their home ground. The quarter–finals saw seven of the eight clubs coming from France, with the only non-French club being Northampton Saints.

Teams
The qualifying teams were drawn from seven countries.  Generally, these were teams from the top division of domestic rugby that did not qualify to play in the Heineken Cup:
 England: 6 teams from the English Premiership
 France: 7 teams from the French Championship 
 Ireland: one team representing one of the four Provinces of Ireland
 Italy: one team from the National Championship of Excellence
 Romania: one team from the National League
 Scotland: one team representing one of the four geographical districts
 Wales: 7 teams from the Welsh Premier Division

Pool stage

Twenty four teams participated in the pool stage of the competition; they were divided into four pools of six teams each, with each team playing the other teams in their pool once only. Matches took place between 12 October and 2 November 1996 and teams were awarded two points for a win and one point for a draw. The winner and runner-up of each pool progressed to the knockout stage of the tournament.

Pool 1

Pool 2

The Treorchy v Bridgend match was not played.

Pool 3

Pool 4

Qualifiers

Knockout stage

Quarter-finals

Semi-finals

Final

See also
European Challenge Cup
1996–97 Heineken Cup

References

 
1996–97 rugby union tournaments for clubs
1996-97
1996–97 in European rugby union
1996–97 in English rugby union
1996–97 in French rugby union
1996–97 in Irish rugby union
1996–97 in Italian rugby union
1996–97 in Romanian rugby union
1996–97 in Scottish rugby union
1996–97 in Welsh rugby union